Venenivibrio stagnispumantis strain CP.B2 is the first microorganisms isolated from the terrestrial hot spring Champagne Pool (75 °C, pH 5.5) in Waiotapu, New Zealand.

Morphology

The cells are motile and slightly curved rods (1.04 to 1.56 µm long and 0.33 to 0.41 µm wide).

Growth conditions

The novel bacterium is an obligate chemolithotroph capable of utilizing H2 as electron donor, O2 as corresponding electron acceptor and CO2 as carbon source. Venenivibrio stagnispumantis gains metabolic energy using the "Knallgas" reaction H2 + ½ O2 → H2O. For growth either elemental sulphur (S0) or thiosulfate (S2O32−) is required. Growth is observed under thermophilic conditions between 45 °C and 75 °C (optimum 70 °C), under moderate acidophilic conditions between pH 4.8 and 5.8 (optimum pH 5.4) and under microaerophilic conditions between 1.0% and 10.0% (v/v) O2 (optimum between 4.0% and 8.0% (v/v) O2).

Phylogeny

Phylogenetic analysis based on 16S rDNA sequences indicate that strain CP.B2 belongs to the order Aquificales and represents the type strain of a novel species of a new genus within the family Hydrogenothermaceae. The 16S rRNA gene sequence for strain CP.B2 is deposited in the GenBank nucleotide sequence database under accession number DQ989208. The G+C content of the genomic DNA is 29.3 mol% which is the lowest G+C content reported for a species of the order Aquificales.

Tolerance to arsenic and antimony compounds

Venenivibrio stagnispumantis  displays tolerance to relatively high concentrations of arsenic and antimony compounds. Cells grew in the presence of up to 8 mM arsenite (As3+), 15 mM trivalent antimony (Sb3+),  and  >20 mM arsenate (As5+) but growth was not observed when As3+ and As5+ were provided as the sole electron donor and acceptor pair.

Nomenclature

Ve.ne.ni.vi' bri.o. (Latin: the vibrio of poison) stag.ni.spu.man' tis. (Latin: from the bubbling pool, pertaining to Champagne Pool).

Culture collection

Venenivibrio stagnispumantis strain CP.B2 is deposited in the Japan Collection of Microorganisms under JCM 14244, in the American Type Culture Collection under ATCC BAA-1398 and in the German Collection of Microorganisms under DSM 18763.

Culture medium

The pH of the medium is adjusted to 5.5, distributed into culture vessels and autoclaved under CO2. After the inoculation the initial gas phase is replaced with H2 / CO2 / O2 (79% / 15% / 6%) and pressurized to 170 kPa.

The pH of the solution is adjusted to 3.0 with HCl.

References

External links

Type strain of Venenivibrio stagnispumantis at BacDive -  the Bacterial Diversity Metadatabase	

Aquificota
Bacteria described in 2008